Maha Kali Amman Temple is a Hindu temple situated in Mutwal, in Colombo, Sri Lanka. It is dedicated to Mahakali, the Hindu goddess of destruction and doomsday. The temple is believed to have been in existence since the Dutch Period (17-18 centuries A.D.). The main festival of the temple is held in January every year.

See also 
Hinduism in Sri Lanka

References

External links
කාලි මෑණියන් දඬුවම් දෙන කතාව ඇත්තද ?

Hindu temples in Western Province, Sri Lanka
Kali temples